The Flying Phantom Elite is a French hydrofoil catamaran sailing dinghy that was designed by Martin Fischer and draws on the work of Alex Udin, Franck Cammas and the Groupama sailing team. It is intended as a one-design racer and was first built in 2015.

The Flying Phantom Essentiel was developed in 2017 as an easier to sail hydrofoil than the Flying Phantom Elite.

Production
The design was built by Phantom International in Dinard France from 2015 to about 2017, but the company is no longer in business and it is now out of production.

Design
The Flying Phantom Elite is a racing sailboat, built predominantly of a pre-preg carbon fibre and Nomex honeycomb sandwich. It has a fractional sloop rig with a carbon fibre mast. The hulls have reverse-raked stems, vertical transoms, transom-hung rudders controlled by a tiller and retractable hydrofoils. It displaces .

The dual rudders are "T"-shaped, while the dual hydrofoil daggerboards are "L"-shaped. All are made from pre-preg, autoclave-cured carbon fibre.

The boat's mainsail and jib are made from VXM Black Technora membrane, while the gennaker is polyester.

See also
List of sailing boat types
List of multihulls

Related development
Flying Phantom Essentiel

References

External links
Official website archives
Flying Phantom Elite video

Dinghies
2010s sailboat type designs
Two-person sailboats
Hydrofoil catamarans
Sailboat type designs by Martin Fischer
Sailboat types built by Phantom International